Asma Menaifi (born 5 June 1986) is an Algerian table tennis player. She competed in the women's singles event at the 2004 Summer Olympics.

References

External links
 

1986 births
Living people
Algerian female table tennis players
Olympic table tennis players of Algeria
Table tennis players at the 2004 Summer Olympics
Place of birth missing (living people)
21st-century Algerian people